1986 Grand Prix may refer to:

 1986 Grand Prix (snooker)
 1986 Grand Prix (tennis)